These are the results of the diving competition at the 1998 World Aquatics Championships, which took place in Perth, Western Australia.

Medal table

Medal summary

Men

Women

1998 World Aquatics Championships
Diving at the World Aquatics Championships